The St. Thomas the Apostle Syro-Malabar Catholic Eparchy of Melbourne is a Syro-Malabar Catholic Church ecclesiastical territory or eparchy of the Catholic Church in Australia. The eparchy was erected by Pope Francis on 11 January 2014. This is the second eparchy of the Syro-Malabar Church outside India, after the Eparchy of Chicago, and it has jurisdiction over Syro-Malabar Catholics in the entirety of Australia.

It is not part of any ecclesiastical province, but immediately subject to the Major Archbishop of Ernakulam-Angamaly and depends on the Roman Congregation for the Oriental Churches. In 2021 its territory was extended to include New Zealand and Oceania. Its future cathedral is the Cathedral of St. Alphonsa in the episcopal see of Melbourne, Victoria.

History 
The eparchy was approved on 23 December 2013 as the Eparchy of Saint Thomas the Apostle of Melbourne, on Australian territory previously without a formal jurisdiction of the Syro-Malabar Catholic Church.

Statistics 
, it pastorally served 50,000 Catholics with 17 priests (5 diocesan, 12 religious), 12 lay religious (brothers).

Ordinaries 
 ''Eparchs (Bishops)
 Bosco Puthur (11 January 2014 – present)

See also 

 Roman Catholicism in Australia

References

External links and sources 
 GCatholic
 Syro Malabar Catholic Church Melbourne 
 Syro Malabar Catholic Church Parramatta

Syro-Malabar Catholic dioceses
Syro-Malabar Catholic Eparchy of Melbourne
Syro-Malabar Catholic Eparchy of Melbourne
2014 establishments in Australia
Eastern Catholic dioceses in Oceania